"The U" is a nickname often given to a university. Specifically, it has been used to refer to:
 The University of Miami
 The U (film), a 2009 documentary about the University of Miami football team.

 The University of Utah

Other uses 
 WCIU-TV, a television station that was formerly branded as "The U";
 WMEU-CD, a television station that currently carries "The U" branding.